Aleksandra Savanović (born 30 August 1994) is a Serbian football midfielder, currently playing for Spartak Subotica.

Honours 
Spartak Subotica
Winner
 Serbian Super Liga (3): 2011–12, 2012–13, 2013–14

External links 
 

1994 births
Living people
Serbian women's footballers
Serbia women's international footballers
Women's association football midfielders
ŽFK Spartak Subotica players